"Grace of My Heart" is MAX's 11th single released under Avex Trax. The title track was used in commercials for Communicase Gum. Its B-side, "Getting Over" was used in a series of commercials for DyDo Mistio soft drinks including one commercial featuring Namie Amuro. Upon release the single debuted at #2, becoming their second highest ranking single behind "Give Me a Shake" which debuted at #1.

Track list

Charts 
Oricon Sales Chart (Japan)

References

See also 
Grace of My Heart, film

1998 singles
MAX (band) songs
Song recordings produced by Max Matsuura
1998 songs